Dirty Talk may refer to:
 Dirty talk, spoken graphically descriptive sexual imagery used for foreplay
 "Dirty Talk" (Klein + M.B.O. song), 1982
 "Dirty Talk" (Wynter Gordon song), 2010
 Dirty language, cursing, cussing, and/or swearing

See also
 dirt talk or dirt talking, see Trash-talk
 Talk Dirty (disambiguation)